Ictinogomphus ferox, commonly called the common tiger or the common tigertail, is a species of dragonfly in the family Gomphidae. It is found in Angola, Botswana, Central African Republic, the Democratic Republic of the Congo, Ivory Coast, Ghana, Guinea, Kenya, Liberia, Malawi, Mozambique, Namibia, Nigeria, Senegal, Somalia, South Africa, Tanzania, Togo, Uganda, Zambia, Zimbabwe, possibly Burundi, and possibly Ethiopia. Its natural habitats are subtropical or tropical moist lowland forests, dry savanna, moist savanna, subtropical or tropical dry shrubland, subtropical or tropical moist shrubland, rivers, intermittent rivers, shrub-dominated wetlands, swamps, freshwater lakes, intermittent freshwater lakes, freshwater marshes, intermittent freshwater marshes, and freshwater springs.

References

Gomphidae
Taxonomy articles created by Polbot
Insects described in 1842